Al-Fajr (“The Dawn”, “Daybreak”) is the eighty-ninth chapter (sura) of the Quran, with 30 ayat or verses. The sura describes destruction of disbelieving peoples: the Ancient Egyptians, the people of Iram of the Pillars, and Mada'in Saleh. It condemns those who love wealth and look with disdain upon the poor and orphans. Righteous people are promised Paradise – the final verse says "And enter you My Paradise!". The Surah is so designated after the word wal-fajr with which it opens.

Summary
1-4 Various oaths by natural objects
5-13 Unbelievers are warned by the fate of Ád, Thamúd, and Pharaoh
14-17 Man praises God in prosperity, but reproaches him in adversity
18-22 Oppression of the poor and the orphan denounced
23-26 The wicked will vainly regret their evil deeds on the judgment-day
27-30  The believing soul invited to the joys of Paradise

Then the surah discusses that Man praises God in prosperity, but reproaches him in adversity in ayaat 14th to 17th. The discourse then denounces the oppression of the poor in ayaat 18th to 22nd. And approaching the end ayaat 23rd to 25th give the verdict that the wicked will vainly regret their evil deeds on the judgment-day, while ayaat 26th to the 30th gives the good news to the believing soul invited to the joys of Paradise.

Period of revelation
Quran chapters are not arranged in the chronological order of believed revelation (wahy). Muhammad told his followers, the sahaba, the placement in Quranic order of every Wahy revealed along with the original text of Quran. Wm Theodore de Bary, an East Asian studies expert, describes that "The final process of collection and codification of the Quran text was guided by one overarching principle: God's words must not in any way be distorted or sullied by human intervention. For this reason, no serious attempt, apparently, was made to edit the numerous revelations, organize them into thematic units, or present them in chronological order....". Surat Al-Fajr is a Meccan sura and meccan suras are chronologically earlier suras that were revealed to Muhammad at Mecca before the hijrah to Medina in 622 CE. They are typically shorter, with relatively short ayat, and mostly come near the end of the Qur'an's 114 surahs. Most of the surahs containing muqatta'at are Meccan. Henceforth apart from traditions, this surah qualifies to be Meccan typically. According to Yusuf Ali, Al-Fajr may be placed in the dating period close to Surat Al-Lail and Ad-Dhuha.

Asbāb al-nuzūl
Asbāb al-nuzūl (occasions or circumstances of revelation) is a secondary genre of Qur'anic exegesis (tafsir) directed at establishing the context in which specific verses of the Qur'an were revealed. Though of some use in reconstructing the Qur'an's historicity, asbāb is by nature an exegetical rather than a historiographical genre, and as such usually associates the verses it explicates with general situations rather than specific events. According to of the mufassirūn this surah was revealed at Mecca, at a stage when opposition to Muhammad had grown to the stage of persecution of new Muslim converts .

According to an interpretation expounded on in the tafsīr (commentary) written by Sayyid Abul Ala Maududi (d. 1979) entitled Tafhim al-Qur'an,

Surah Al-Fajr in hadith 
Hadīṯh (حديث) is literally "speech"; recorded saying or tradition of Muhammad validated by isnad; with sira these comprise the sunnah and reveal shariah. Hadith has been called "the backbone" of Islamic civilization, and within that religion, the authority of hadith as a source for religious law and moral guidance ranks second only to that of the Qur'an. This surah appears in a hadith that recommend its recitation in Salah.

 It was narrated that Jabir said:"Muadh stood up and prayed Isha', and made it lengthy. The Prophet (ﷺ) said: 'Do you want to cause hardship to the people, O Mu'adh; do you want to cause hardship to the people O Mu'adh? Why didn't you recite 'Glorify the Name of your Lord Most High' or Ad-Dhuha or; 'When the heaven is cleft asunder?"

Theme of the surah
There are almost seven divisions in the Qur'an according to Themes. The last of these seven sections goes from surah Al-Mulk [surah number 67] to surah Al-Nas [surah number 114]. This final part [last seventh of the Quran] focuses on sources of reflection, people, final scenes they will face on Judgment Day and hellfire and paradise in general and admonition to the Quraysh about their fate in the present and the hereafter if they deny Muhammad, specifically. This surah Al-Fajr forms a pair with the next one Al-Balad. The central theme of both the surahs is to reprimand the leaders of the Quraysh for the rebellious attitude and arrogant behavior they have adopted with regard to Allah and their fellow human beings after being bestowed with favors and riches.

References

External links
Quran 89 Clear Quran translation

Fajr
Islamic eschatology
Tribes of Arabia
Ramesses II
Iram of the Pillars